Saeed Suwaidan (Arabic:سعيد سويدان) (born 19 May 1997) is an Emirati footballer. He currently plays as a right back for Al Bataeh on loan from Al-Nasr.

Career
Suwaidan started his career at Al-Nasr and is a product of the Al-Nasr's youth system. On 11 January 2018, Suwaidan made his professional debut for Al-Nasr against Al-Sharjah in the Pro League, replacing Salem Saleh.

External links

References

1997 births
Living people
Emirati footballers
Olympic footballers of the United Arab Emirates
Al-Nasr SC (Dubai) players
Al Bataeh Club players
UAE Pro League players
Association football fullbacks
Place of birth missing (living people)